Nevado de Palermo is a peak in Argentina (also sometimes known as Morro del Quemado) with an elevation of  metres. Palermo is one of the highest points of Sierra de Cachi. It is located within the territory of the Argentinean province of Salta, cities of Cachi and La Poma.

First Ascent 
Palermo was first climbed by Enrique Pantaleón (Argentina) December 20, 1975.

Elevation 
Other data from available digital elevation models: SRTM yields 6147 metres, ASTER 6179 metres and TanDEM-X 6195 metres. The height of the nearest key col is 5479 meters, leading to a topographic prominence of 705 meters. Palermo is considered a Mountain Subgroup according to the Dominance System  and its dominance is 11.4%. Its parent peak is Nevado de Cachi and the Topographic isolation is 11.1 kilometers.

External links 

 Elevation information about Palermo
 Weather Forecast at Palermo

See also
List of mountains in the Andes

References

Mountains of Argentina
Six-thousanders of the Andes